is a ski area in Nasushiobara, Tochigi Prefecture, Japan, which was developed by the owners of Hunter Mountain in New York.

See also
List of ski areas and resorts in Asia

External links
 official website
 official website

Ski areas and resorts in Japan
Sports venues in Tochigi Prefecture